Viaje sin regreso is a  1946 Argentine black-and-white film written by Hugo Mac Dougall and directed by Pierre Chenal.

Cast
 Eloy Álvarez		
 Guillermo Battaglia		
 Sebastián Chiola		
 Francisco de Paula		
 Fausto Fornoni
 Mercedes Gisper		
 Florence Marly		
 Mary Parets		
 Amalia Sánchez Ariño	
 Alberto Terrones		
 Carlos Thompson

References

External links
 

1946 films
Films directed by Pierre Chenal
1940s Spanish-language films
Argentine black-and-white films
Argentine drama films
1946 drama films
1940s Argentine films